Antonio Moreira (20 January 1897 – 28 January 1937) was a Spanish sports shooter. He competed in seven events at the 1920 Summer Olympics.

References

External links
 

1897 births
1937 deaths
Spanish male sport shooters
Olympic shooters of Spain
Shooters at the 1920 Summer Olympics
Place of birth missing